Outdoor Voices (sometimes just O.V.) is an American clothing company focused on the design and sale of athletic apparel. The company was founded in 2013 by Tyler Haney in New York City, and is now headquartered in Austin. The company's products are sold online and at its stores. On February 25, 2020, Haney tendered her resignation, and Cliff Moskowitz, the president of a fashion-oriented private equity firm, took over as interim CEO.

History and operations 
The company's founder, Tyler Haney, was motivated to found Outdoor Voices due to a love of sports and athletics. She founded Outdoor Voices in 2013 after studying business at Parsons School of Design. In early 2014, J. Crew selected the Outdoor Voices line for its stores’ "Brands We Love" sections after the line was featured in a London boutique, Garbstore. The company's first store opened in Austin in October 2014 and its first pop-up shop opened in Manhattan in 2015. The company was known initially for their "kits," which included a collection of tops and bottoms that could be mixed and matched for a bundled price.

Over time, Outdoor Voices raised over $9.5 million from investors like General Catalyst Partners. In 2015, Outdoor Voices received $7.5 million in investments to start their active apparel line. In 2016, Haney decided to move the company to Austin, Texas to focus on building a new and a bigger headquarters for the company and hired more employees including some of Haney's friends from high school. Mickey Drexler, the former CEO of Gap Inc. and J. Crew Group, Inc., became the company's chairman of the board in the summer of 2017. As of March 2018, the company had raised roughly $57 million in funding. Lead investors include GV, General Catalyst Partners, and Forerunner Ventures. On April 24, 2018, Outdoor Voices launched a running collection with Hoka One One. They also released a corresponding app called O.V. Trail Shop. The app features the nearest Trail Shops where the new running collection can be found. In 2018, Outdoor Voices launched their first swimwear collection called “H2Ov”.

Outdoor Voices has collaborated with other clothing and exercise-related companies to produce limited run products. Collaborators include the fashion blog Man Repeller, ClassPass, and French fashion label A.P.C.

Controversy 
In February 2020, in an effort to restructure the company, Haney stepped down as CEO. Several executive abruptly departed the company, and an anonymous letter blamed CEO Tyler Haney for the staff exits, calling her "spoiled" and criticizing her leadership. Haney struggled to work with Mickey Drexler, the retail executive who had previously led J.Crew and Gap. By March 2020, the company had "imploded," according to The New York Times.  In January of 2020, the company's valuation was $40 million, down from its 2018 valuation of $110 million. Outdoor Voices indicated that there would be an additional 15 layoffs across the company.

References

External links

American companies established in 2013
2013 establishments in New York City
Companies based in Austin, Texas
Clothing brands of the United States
Online clothing retailers of the United States
Retail companies established in 2013
Clothing companies established in 2013
Sportswear brands